The following is a comparison of TeX editors.

Table of editors

See also 
 Formula editor
 Comparison of word processors
 Comparison of text editors
 Comparison of desktop publishing software
 List of TeX extensions

Notes and references 

TeX editors
Free TeX editors
TeX editors